"Gooey" is a song by British experimental rock band Glass Animals, released on 14 February 2014 as the lead single from their debut studio album Zaba (2014).

The song received positive reviews from critics, and ranked at number 12 on the Triple J's Hottest 100 of 2014, the band's highest placing until 2020, when "Heat Waves" topped the poll.

Composition
Dave Bayley laid down his vocals holding a pineapple named "Sasha Fierce", and recorded the final chorus in eight different impressions, including "an old woman, a drunk crack addict, [and] a terrible impression of James Brown" to replicate the sound of a choir.

Live performances
Glass Animals performed "Gooey" on Late Night with Seth Meyers in 2014, and again on The Late Show with David Letterman on 24 February 2015.

In popular culture
"Gooey" was featured on the soundtrack for the film Magic Mike XXL.
"Gooey" is played in the background of Reign, Season 2, Episode 19 around the 24:37 minute mark.

Charts

Weekly charts

Year-end charts

Certifications

References

2014 singles
2014 songs
Glass Animals songs